Severin Freund (born 11 May 1988) is a German former ski jumper and current TV expert. He competed at World Cup level from 2008 to 2022, and is one of the most successful ski jumpers from Germany, having won the overall World Cup title in 2015, and scoring 22 individual World Cup wins. As a member of the German national team, Freund won a gold medal at the 2014 Winter Olympics and later became the 2015 World Champion on both the large hill and mixed team competitions.

Career
Having made his Continental Cup debut in December 2004, his best result is the victory from Lillehammer in September 2008. He won a gold medal in the team competition at the 2008 Junior World Ski Championships. He made his World Cup debut in December 2007 in Engelberg, and his best result before the 2011 season was a 12th place from Sapporo in January 2010.

On 29 December 2010, he reached the 6th place of the first event of the Four Hills Tournament in Oberstdorf. On 15 January 2011, he achieved his first ever World Cup victory at the first competition at Sapporo. In the same season, he won his first world championship medal finishing third with the team in the Team normal hill competition in Oslo. He finished seventh in the 2011 World Cup season.

TV 
Severin Freund has been a ski jumping expert for ZDF since February 2023.

Record

FIS World Nordic Ski Championships results

FIS Ski Flying World Championships

World Cup

Standings

Wins

Individual starts (250)

References

External links

1988 births
Living people
People from Freyung-Grafenau
Sportspeople from Lower Bavaria
German male ski jumpers
FIS Nordic World Ski Championships medalists in ski jumping
Ski jumpers at the 2014 Winter Olympics
Olympic ski jumpers of Germany
Olympic gold medalists for Germany
Olympic medalists in ski jumping
Medalists at the 2014 Winter Olympics
ZDF people
German sports journalists